This is a list of programmes broadcast by MBC 4.

Programming 
Dubbing and subtitling of all series is in Arabic.

Shows 
 الحياة تركي
 4N1K
 The 45 Rules of Divorce
 A-List Lifestyle
 Al-Hayah Turki
 Al-Hayat Turkish
 Al-Hayah Turkey
 Al-Hayat Turkey
 Action Zone
 Al Anisa Farah
 Ba’at Al Ward
 Big Apple Music Awards
 Beauty Match
 Beauty Match: Tahadi Al Fashionista
 Box Office Top 5
 Celebrity Scoop
 Celebrity Style Story
 Chancers
 Comedy Movies
 Designers, Fashions and Runways
 Extra تركي
 Extra Turkey
 Extra Turkish
 Extra Turki
 Famous Foodies
 Fashion
 Fashion Forward
 Fatma
 Films & Stars
 Free Mashup
 Hala
 Hollywood Buzz
 Hollywood Me!
 Hollywood stars
 Hollywood Stars
 How to Live Longer
 The Intimate Story of Isabel Allende
 Khareef al Hob
 Kitchen Millionaire
 Love Songs
 MBC Beauty Match
 Making the Movies
 Miss Farah
 Must Haves
 The Mix
 Nesa'a Ha'erat
 Newton's Cradle
 Oghneyat Hob
 Planet Action
 Reel Talk
 Scoop
 Scoop Box Office
 Scoop Network
 Scoop On Runway
 Scoop On Set
 Scoop with Raya
 StarTalk
 Special Hour
 Travel In Style
 US Box Office

News and current affairs 
 20/20
 48 Hours
 60 Minutes
 ABC World News
 ABC World News Tonight
 America This Morning
 CBS Evening News
 CBS Market Watch
 CBS Overnight News
 The Early Show
 Face the Nation
 Good Morning America
 Nightline
 Primetime
 World News Now

Entertainment 
 A-List Lifestyle
 Action Zone
 Box Office America
 Box Office Top 5
 Celebrity Scoop
 Celebrity Style Story
 Entertainment Tonight
 Extra تركي
 Extra Turkey
 Extra Turkish
 Extra Turki
 Famous Foodies
 Fashion
 Fashion Forward
 Films & Stars
 Inside Edition
 Inside Edition Week
 News Magazine
 Ness Hollywood
 Hala
 Hollywood Buzz
 Hollywood Me!
 Hollywood stars
 Hollywood Stars
 The Insider
 Making the Movies
 Planet Action
 Reel Talk
 Scoop
 Scoop Box Office
 Scoop Network
 Scoop On Runway
 Scoop On Set
 Scoop with Raya
 StarTalk
 Young Hollywood's Greatest...
 Young Hollywood Presents Evolution of…

Home shopping 
 Home Shopping Network (HSN)
 QVC Network
 TVSN

 Home Shopping Network (HSN) USA
 QVC Network UK
 TVSN Australia

Soap operas 
 The Bold and the Beautiful
 Days of Our Lives
 October Road
 October Road (TV series)

Talk shows 
 Conan
 The Doctors
 The Dr. Oz Show
 Dr. Phil
 Late Show with David Letterman
 The Oprah Winfrey Show
 Rachael Ray
 Saturday Night Live
 The Talk

Comedy & sitcoms 
 2 Broke Girls
 30 Rock
 3rd Rock From the Sun
 8 Simple Rules
 All That
 All of Us
 According To Jim
 Becker
 The Bernie Mac Show
 Big Time Rush
 Better Off Ted
 The Big Bang Theory
 Breaking In
 Bella and the Bulldogs
 Brothers
 Bucket & Skinner's Epic Adventures
 Bad Teacher
 Clueless
 Community
 Courting Alex
 Cory in the House
 Cuts
 Dharma & Greg
 Don't Trust the B---- in Apartment 23
 Drake & Josh
 Everybody Hates Chris
 Everybody Loves Raymond
 Even Stevens
 Fred: The Show
 Frasier
 Friends
 Friends with Benefits
 Full House
 The Goldbergs
 Goldie's Oldies
 Go On
 Ground Floor
 Good Luck Charlie
 Game Shakers
 The Golden Girls
 Home Improvement
 Hope & Faith
 How I Met Your Mother
 The Haunted Hathaways
 Hannah Montana
 I'm in the Band
 iCarly
 Instant Mom
 It's Always Sunny in Philadelphia
 Jake in Progress
 Just Jordan
 Joey
 Jonas
 The King of Queens
 Kitchen Confidential
 Kenan & Kel
 Last Man Standing
 Level Up
 The Late Show with David Letterman
 The League
 Life with Derek
 The Latest Buzz
 Less Than Perfect
 Living with Fran
 Mad About You
 Mad Love
 Malcolm in the Middle
 Married to the Kellys
 Men at Work
 The Michael J. Fox Show
 The Middle
 Mike & Molly
 The Millers
 The Mindy Project
 My Name is Earl
 My Wife & Kids
 New Girl
 Ned's Declassified School Survival Guide
 Naturally, Sadie
 Nicky, Ricky, Dicky & Dawn
 Out of Practice
 Odd Mom Out
 The Office
 One on One
 Outsourced
 Phil of the Future
 Parks and Recreation
 Quintuplets
 Raising Hope
 Rules of Engagement
 Sabrina, the Teenage Witch
 Scrubs
 Sam & Cat
 Side Hustle
 See Dad Run
 Seinfeld
 The Simpsons
 Silicon Valley
 Still Standing
 Sonny with a Chance
 Super Fun Night
 That '70s Show
 The Suite Life on Deck
 The Suite Life of Zack & Cody
 That’s So Raven
 The Thundermans
 Traffic Light
 Two and a Half Men
 Two Guys and a Girl
 True Jackson, VP
 Up All Night
 Unfabulous
 Veep
 Victorious
 Wedding Band
 Wendell & Vinnie
 Wizards of Waverly Place
 Whitney
 Your Family or Mine
 Zeke and Luther
 Zoey 101

Drama 
 The 45 Rules of Divorce
 90210 (season 5)
 90210 (season 1)
 90210 (season 2)
 90210
 Amas de Casa Desesperadas
 Alias
 Alia
 Ally McBeal
 Angel
 The Affair
 Army Wives
 Arrow
 Awake
 Aaron Stone
 Beauty & the Beast
 Beauty and the Beast
 The Best Years
 Big Love
 Big Little Lies
 Bones
 Boston Public
 Brooklyn Nine-Nine
 The Bureau of Magical Things
 Buffy The Vampire Slayer
 Canterbury's Law
 The Carrie Diaries
 Crazy Ex-Girlfriend
 Charlie's Angels
 Charmed
 Commander in Chief
 Crossing Jordan
 Dallas
 Damages
 Dawson's Creek
 The Dead Zone
 The Defenders
 Darcy's Wild Life
 Desperate Housewives
 The District
 Drop Dead Diva
 Don't Say Goodbye (Turkish Series)
 Eastwick
 Ed
 Elementary
 Emily Owens, M.D.
 Empire
 Everwood
 ER
 Eye Candy
 The Enemy Within
 Flight 29 Down
 Falcon Beach
 Fantasy Island
 Franklin & Bash
 Fantasy Island
 The Finder
 The Game
 Girlfriends' Guide to Divorce
 Girlfriends' Guide to Divorce (AR)
 Game of Thrones
 Ghost Whisperer
 Gilmore Girls
 Glee
 The Good Wife
 The Good Wife
 Gossip Girl
 Gossip Girl
 Grey's Anatomy
 Grey's Anatomy (season 3)
 Grimm
 The Guardian
 Gigantic
 Holly's Heroes
 Hollywood Heights
 Hart of Dixie
 Hawthorne
 Hellcats
 Hunter Street
 House
 House, M.D.
 House of Cards
 House of Anubis
 In Plain Sight
 Jake 2.0
 Justified
 Kevin Hill
 Killer Instinct
 Life
 Las Vegas
 Law & Order
 Law & Order: Criminal Intent
 Law & Order: LA
 Law & Order: Special Victims Unit
 Law & Order: Trial by Jury
 Law & Order True Crime
 The Leftovers
 Life Unexpected
 Life with Bonnie
 Lincoln Heights
 Lois & Clark: The New Adventures of Superman
 The Lying Game
 Life Goes On (Turkish Series)
 The Lost Dream
 The Lost Dream  (Turkish Series)
 Lizzie McGuire
 Lassie
 Jane the Virgin
 Jane the Virgin (AR)
 Mad Men
 Majority Rules!
 Medical Investigation
 Medium
 Melrose Place
 Men in Trees
 Mercy
 Miami Medical
 Miami Trauma
 Miss Match
 Miss Farah
 Magnum
 Magnum, P.I.
 M.I. High
 Missing
 Monk
 Moonlighting
 NCIS
 Necessary Roughness
 The Newsroom
 The Night Shift
 North Shore
 Nurse Jackie
 Newton's Cradle
 Numbers
 The O.C.
 Once And Again
 Outlander
 October Road
 October Road (TV series)
 Pan Am
 Parenthood
 Pepper Dennis
 The Philanthropist
 Popular
 Presidio Med
 Pretty Little Liars
 Private Practice
 Privileged
 Power Rangers
 Psych
 Rush
 Reign
 Ravenswood
 Rescue Me
 Ringer
 Rizzoli and Isles
 Royal Pains
 The Sarah Jane Adventures
 The Secret Circle
 Sex and the City
 Star Falls
 Six Degrees
 Smash
 Stalker
 Star-Crossed
 Strong Medicine
 The Sparticle Mystery
 Sue Thomas: F.B.Eye
 Suits
 Summerland
 Time After Time
 True Detective
 Three Wishes
 The Troop
 Tower Prep
 Unforgettable
 Ugly Betty
 The Vampire Diaries
 What About Brian?
 The Whole Truth
 Wilfred
 When Saying Goodbye
 The Wall: Cover Your Tracks
 The Wall 2: The Chateau Murder
 Why Women Kill
 Women's Murder Club
 The X-Files

Game shows 
 The Chase USA
 Jeopardy!
 The Moment of Truth
 Wheel of Fortune
 Wheel of Fortune

From the BBC 
 5 Days
 Arabian Nights
 'Allo 'Allo!
 Absolutely Fabulous
 Anthea Turner: Perfect Housewife
 As Time Goes By
 Atlantis
 Ballykissangel
 Blackadder
 Brilliant Creatures
 Deadly 60
 Celebrity MasterChef
 Five Days
 Gavin & Stacey
 Junior MasterChef
 Keeping Up Appearances
 Killing Eve
 The Little Paris Kitchen: Cooking with Rachel Khoo
 M.I. High
 Mary Queen of Shops
 MasterChef
 MasterChef: The Professionals
 Men Behaving Badly (series 3-6)
 Merlin
 The New Statesman
 The Night Manager
 Not the Nine O'Clock News
 The Office
 The Really Wild Show
 Robot Wars (series 8-10)
 The Sarah Jane Adventures
 Sparticle Mystery
 Spooks
 The Thin Blue Line
 To the Manor Born
 The Tudors
 What Not to Wear
 You Rang, M'Lord?

From ITV 
 Agatha Christie's Marple
 Agatha Christie's Poirot
The Benny Hill Show
 The Bill
 Britain's Got Talent
 Britain's Got Talent S12
 Britain's Got Talent (season 12)
 The Chase UK
 Downton Abbey
 Foyle's War
 Heartbeat
 Hell's Kitchen
 I'm a Celebrity...Get Me Out of Here!
 Law & Order: UK
 Midsomer Murders
 Mind Your Language
 Mr. Bean
 Mr. Selfridge
 Peak Practice
 Quiz
 Tricky TV
 Wheel of Fortune UK
 The X Factor UK
 The X Factor: Battle of the Stars
 The X Factor: Celebrity
 The X Factor: The Band

From Channel 4 
 Brat Camp UK
 Celebrity Wedding Planner
 Gok's Style Secrets
 Ramsay's Kitchen Nightmares
 Supernanny
 Wife Swap

From UKTV 
 The Clothes Show

From RTÉ Ireland 
 MasterChef Ireland

From Network Ten Australia 
 Australian Princess
 Celebrity MasterChef Australia
 Junior MasterChef Australia
 MasterChef Australia
 MasterChef Australia: The Professionals
 Rush
 The X Factor Australia

From Seven Network Australia 
 Winners & Losers
 The Chase Australia
 The X Factor Australia

From Television New Zealand 
 MasterChef New Zealand

From M-Net 
 MasterChef South Africa

From Ebony Life TV 
 Desperate Housewives Africa

From Disney 
A.N.T. Farm
Austin & Ally
 Alex & Co.
 Binny and the Ghost
 Bunk'd
 Best Friends Whenever
 Bizaardvark
 Dog with a Blog
 Cookabout
 Coop & Cami Ask the World 
 Cory in the House
 Disney Fam Jam
 Even Stevens
 Gabby Duran & the Unsittables
 Girl Meets World
 Good Luck Charlie
 Hannah Montana
 I Didn't Do It
 Jessie
 Jonas
 Just Roll with It
 K.C. Undercover
 Lab Rats
 Liv and Maddie
 Lizzie McGuire
 Phil of the Future
 Raven's Home
 Soy Luna
 Secrets of Sulphur Springs
 Shake It Up
 Sydney to the Max
 Sonny with a Chance
 So Random!
 The Evermoor Chronicles
 The Suite Life of Zack & Cody
 The Suite Life on Deck
 That's So Raven
 Violetta
 Walk the Prank
 Wizards of Waverly Place

From Cartoon Network series 
 Tower Prep
 Level Up

From Nickelodeon 

 Goldie's Oldies
 All That
 The Bureau of Magical Things
 The Haunted Hathaways 
 Max & Shred
 Drake & Josh
 iCarly
 Just Jordan
 Victorious
 The Troop
 Unfabulous
 The Thundermans
 Nickelodeon Kids' Choice Awards Abu Dhabi
 Side Hustle

 Sam and Cat
 True Jackson, VP
 Ned's Declassified School Survival Guide
 Zoey 101
 Kenan & Kel
 Big Time Rush
 Fred: The Show
 Nicky, Ricky, Dicky & Dawn
 The Haunted Hathaways
 Bella and the Bulldogs
 Game Shakers
 Kids Choice Awards

 Hollywood Heights
 Wendell & Vinnie
 See Dad Run
 Instant Mom
 Gigantic
 Bucket & Skinner's Epic Adventures
 House of Anubis
 Star Falls
 Hunter Street
 Nickelodeon Kids' Choice Awards

Reality 
 America's Got Talent
 America's Supernanny
 American Idol
 American Inventor
 The Apprentice
 The Bachelor
 The Biggest Loser
 Brat Camp USA
 Bridezillas
 The Celebrity Apprentice
 Celebrity Rehab with Dr. Drew
 The Cut
 Canada's Got Talent
 DC Cupcakes
 Face Off
 The Fashion Fund
 Gallery Girls
 Haunted Hotels
 Hell's Kitchen USA
 House Swap
 I Can See Your Voice
 Keeping Up With the Kardashians
 Lip Sync Battle
 Lip Sync Battle Shorties
 Living Lahaina
 Making the Band
 The Masked Singer
 The Masked Dancer
 MasterChef Canada
 MasterChef USA
 Miss Seventeen
 Models of the Runway
 The Next: Fame Is at Your Doorstep
 Pimp My Ride
 Planet Cake
 Project Accessory
 Project Runway
 Race to the Altar
 The Real Housewives of Atlanta
 The Real Housewives of Beverly Hills
 The Real Housewives of D.C.
 The Real Housewives of Melbourne
 The Real Housewives of New Jersey
 The Real Housewives of New York City
 The Real Housewives of Orange County
 Say Yes to the Dress
 Say Yes to the Dress: UK
 Say Yes to the Dress: Atlanta
 Shaq's Big Challenge
 She's Got the Look
 Shedding for the Wedding
 Supernanny
 Supernanny USA
 So You Think You Can Dance
 Style Me with Rachel Hunter
 Tim Gunn's Guide to Style
 Three Wishes
 Top Chef
 Tori & Dean: Home Sweet Hollywood
 The X Factor USA
 What Not to Wear USA
 Who Do You Think You Are?
 Wife Swap USA
 XOX Betsey Johnson

Clip shows 
 America's Funniest Home Videos

Miniseries 
 Arabian Nights
 Political Animals
 Lost in the West
 Mildred Pierce

Spanish series 
 Desaparecidos
 El embarcadero
 El ministerio del tiempo
 Hermanos
 La caza
 Madres. Amor y vida
 Presunto culpable
 Pulsaciones
 Secretos de Estado
 Sé quién eres
 Stolen Away
 Traición
 Unauthorized Living
 Velvet

Spanish-language series 
 La bella y las bestias
 La Piloto

Japanese series 
Masked Rider Ex Aid
Ultraman Ginga

Italian series 
 Back To The Island
 My Brilliant Friend

Argentine series 
 Lalola

German series 
 Meine Mutter …

Slovenian series
 Divoké kone

Telenovelas 
 احببت اعمى
 الملائكة الصغار
 Amor Maior
 Cordel Encantado
 India: A Love Story
 Desire
 Direito de Amar
 El Cuerpo del Deseo
 En tierras salvajes
 Kud puklo da puklo
 Fashion House
 Larin izbor 
 La reina soy yo
 Monarch Cove
 Nazaré
 Paixão
 Pasión
 Rainha das Flores 
 Rubí
 Terra Brava
 Vatre ivanjske
 Zora dubrovačka

Indian series 
 India: A Love Story
 Chittod Ki Rani Padmini Ka Johur
 Caminho das Índias
 Ek Hasina Thi
 Saraswatichandra
 Jeevan Saathi
 Kitani Mohabbat Hai 
 Kitani Mohabbat Hai 2
 Mahi Way 
 Rishta.com

Young people's shows 
 Bindi the Jungle Girl
 The Blobheads
 Gaming Show (In My Parents' Garage)
 Pirate Islands
 Scout's Safari
 Black Hole High
 Wicked Science
 Strange Days at Blake Holsey High
 Scooter: Secret Agent
 Max & Shred

Turkish drama 
 20 Dakika
 4N1K
 4N1K İlk Aşk
 Arıza
 Aliye
 al hob al mustahil
 Al Qareeb
Al hob al mostaheel
 Al ghareeb
 alzahra albayd
 Al-Ghareeb
 Alia
 Aziz
 Aşk Mantık İntikam
 Ayrılık
 Ada Masalı
 Annem
 Asi
 A.Ş.K.
 Aşk ve Ceza
 Aşk-ı Memnu
 Asmalı Konak
 Baeeat Al-Ward
 Berivan
 Benim Hala Umudum Var
 Benim Tatlı Yalanım
 Beyaz Gelincik
 Bıçak Sırtı
 Bay Yanlış
 Baht Oyunu
 Bir İstanbul Masalı
 Binbir Gece
 Bitmeyen Şarkı
 Brave and Beautiful
 Çarpışma
 Çukur
 Çilek Kokusu
 Cam Tavanlar
 Çemberimde Gül Oya
 Dinle Sevgili
 Don't Say Goodbye (Turkish Series)
 Elveda Derken
 Evlilik Hakkında Her Şey
 Elveda Rumeli
 Eve Düşen Yıldırım
 Ezel
 Fame
 Fame
 Fatima
 Forbiden Love
 Fatmagül'ün Suçu Ne?
 Fatma
 Haziran Gecesi
 Huzur Sokağı
 Gameat al Moshghbeen
 Genco
 Gönülçelen
 Gümüş
 Güneşi Beklerken
 Güneşin Kızları
 İlişki Durumu: Karışık
 Ihlamurlar Altında
 İçerde
 Kaderimin Yazıldığı Gün
 Kampüsistan
 Khareef al Hob
 Kuzey Güney
 Kara Para Aşk
 Kalpsiz Adam
 Kaybollan Yıllar
 Kiralık Aşk
 Karayılan
 Kiraz Mevsimi
 Kınalı Kar
 Kırık Kanatlar
 Kavak Yelleri
 Kızım Nerede?
 Küçük Gelin
 Kurt Seyit ve Şura
 Lale Devri
 The Lost Dream  (Turkish Series)
 La makan la watan
 la makan la watan
 Life Goes On (Turkish Series)
 The Lost Dream
 Love Songs
 Hatırla Sevgili
 Muhtesem Yuzyil
 Medcezir
 Mirna Wa Khalil
 Madd Wa Jazr
 Menajerimi Ara
 Mirna and Khalil
 Mrs. Fazilet and Her Daughters
 Merhamet
 Mazi Kalbimde Yaradır
 "Mahkum - Şehrin Kralları"
 Nesa'a Ha'erat
 Nesa'a Haerat
 Nada El Omr
 Nada El Omr
 Jerh Al Mady
 Oghneyat Hob
 Öyle Bir Geçer Zaman Ki
 Öğretmen
 Paramparça
 Samanyolu
 Serçe
 Son
 sanawat el daya3
 Sanawāt adh-Dhayā‘
 Sanawat el daya'a
 Sefirin Kızı
 Sen Çal Kapımı
 Son Bahar
 Stiletto Vendetta
 Şöhret
 Tek Türkiye
 Tozluyaka
 Tatar Ramazan
Thaman al shohra 
 The Lost Dream
 Vazgeç Gönlüm
 Umutsuz Ev Kadınları
 Utak Tefek Cinayetler
 Qesat Shetta
 Yabancı Damat
 Yamak Ahmet
 Yersiz Yurtsuz
 Yaprak Dökümü
 Yeşeren Düşler
 Yer Gök Aşk
 Zoraki Koca
 Zemheri

Korean drama 
 The 1st Shop of Coffee Prince
 About Time
 Are You Human?
 At Eighteen
 Beautiful World
 The Beauty Inside
 Big
 Boys Over Flowers
 Cheat on Me If You Can
 Cinderella Man
 Clean with Passion for Now
 Discovery of Love
 Dream High
 Dream High 2
 Extraordinary You
 Fashion King
 Find Me in Your Memory
 Gangnam Beauty
 He Is Psychometric
 Heartstrings
 The Heirs
 Her Private Life
 Hotel Del Luna
 Lawless Lawyer
 Love in Sadness
 My Secret Terrius
 Mary Stayed Out All Night
 Master's Sun
 Matrimonial Chaos
 Men Are Men
 Moment of Eighteen
 More Than Friends
 My Fair Lady
 My Princess
 Personal Taste
 Playful Kiss
 The Producers
 Reply 1988
 Reply 1994
 Reply 1997
 The Red Sleeve
 Rooftop Prince
 Search: WWW
 Secret Love Affair
 Suspicious Partner
 That Winter, the Wind Blows
 Touch Your Heart
 True Beauty
 Uncontrollably Fond
 Welcome
 What's Wrong with Secretary Kim
 When My Love Blooms
 Whisper
 When I Was the Most Beautiful
 You're Beautiful
 Oh My Venus

Pakistani drama 
 Dil e Muztar
 Humsafar
 Maat
 Malaal
 Mata-e-Jaan Hai Tu
 Mera Naseeb
 Meray Qatil Meray Dildar
 Zindagi Gulzar Hai
 Qurban
 Baydardi
 Kaisa Hai Naseeban
 Ishq Tamasha

Brazilian drama 
 Amor de Mãe
 Além do Tempo
 Amores Roubados
 Aruanas
 Caminho das Índias
 Cordel Encantado
 Direito de Amar
 Deus Salve o Rei
 Dupla Identidade
 A Fórmula
 Justiça
 Onde Está Meu Coração
 India: A Love Story
 Rock Story
 Salve-se Quem Puder
 Sob Pressão
 Sol Nascente
 Totalmente Demais
 Treze Dias Longe do Sol
 Verdades Secretas

Persian Drama 
 Eghma

Greek drama 
To Tatouaz

Special events 
 Academy Awards
 Nickelodeon Kids' Choice Awards
 Academy of Country Music Awards
 American Music Awards
 Brit Awards
 Golden Globe Awards
 Grammy Awards
 Kids' Choice Awards
 Nickelodeon Kids' Choice Awards Abu Dhabi

Past special events 
 Alicia Keys live at Maraya with AlUla Moments (2022)
 Alicia Keys - AlUla Moments (2022)
 Adele One Night Only (2021)
 David Guetta: United At Home - Dubai Edition (2021)
 Nickelodeon Kids' Choice Awards Abu Dhabi (2019)
 Distinctive International Arab Festivals Awards
 Grease: Live (2016)
 Wedding of Prince William and Catherine Middleton (2011)
 Madonna: The Confessions Tour From London (2007)
 Oral Fixation Tour (2007)
 Shakira - Live in Oral Fixation Tour Dubai 2007 (2007)
 Shakira in Dubai 2007 (2007)
 Shakira - Live in Dubai 2007 (2007)
 Shakira - Shakira Oral Fixation Tour Dubai (2007)
 Robbie Williams - Live in Berlin (2005)

Music
Adele
Ariana Grande
Alicia Keys
Beyoncé
BTS
Britney Spears
Bridgit Mendler
Billie Eilish
Big Time Rush
Blackpink
The Cheetah Girls
Coldplay
David Guetta
Demi Lovato
Dove Cameron
Elizabeth Gillies
Emma Roberts
Ellie Goulding
Hailee Steinfeld
Halsey
Hamza Hawsawi
Helly Luv
Michael Jackson
Hannah Montana
Madonna
JoJo Siwa
Jamie Lynn Spears
Jessie J
John Legend
K-pop
Keke Palmer
Katy Perry
Lady Gaga
Low Deep T
Miranda Cosgrove
Marshmello
Miley Cyrus
Mabel
Nicki Minaj
Raven-Symoné
Rihanna
RedOne
RedOne
Robbie Williams
Ricky Martin
Selena Gomez
Shakira
Stray Kids
Super Junior-K.R.Y.
Super Junior-D&E
Super Junior
Taylor Swift
TJ Cases
Victoria Justice

Films

North American films 
 10 Things I Hate About You
 13 Going on 30
 17 Again
 27 Dresses
 500 Days of Summer
 About Schmidt
 Across the Universe
 All Good Things
 Almost Christmas
 All the Pretty Horses
 Almost Famous
 Along Came Polly
 American Beauty
 August Rush
 August: Oscage County
 The Age of Adaline
 A Bad Moms Christmas
 The Bachelor
 Blades of Glory
 Black Nativity
 The Back-up Plan
 The Ballad of Jack and Rose
 Being Julia
 The Best Man
 Bad Moms
 Bewitched
 Black Swan
 Blind Dating
 Blonde Ambition
 Blue Crush
 The Big Wedding
 The Bounty Hunter
 The Brave One
 The Break-Up
 Breakin' All the Rules
 Breaking the Girls
 Burlesque
 Confessions of a Teenage Drama Queen
 Conviction
 Crazy, Stupid, Love
 Contagion
 Crossroads
 The Curse of the Jade Scorpion
 Christmas with the Kranks
 The Devil Wears Prada
 Down With Love
 Dreamgirls
 The Disappearance of Eleanor Rigby
 Dinner for Schmucks
 Easy A
 Eat Pray Love
 Ever After
 Failure to Launch
 Fame
 The Family Stone
 Flightplan
 Fools Rush In
 Friends with Benefits
 Garden State
 Ghost in the Shell
 Ghost Town
 The Girl on the Train
 Gravity
 A Good Woman
 Hairspray
 Hanging Up
 The Heartbreak Kid
 Hell's Kitchen
 Hitch
 The Help
 Hope Floats
 House of Sand and Fog
 The Hundred-Foot Journey
 How Do You Know
 How to Lose a Guy in 10 Days
 I Could Never Be Your Woman
 I Love You, Man
 In Good Company
 In Her Shoes
 It's a Boy Girl Thing
 I Am Number Four
 Jawbreaker
 Just Wright
 Lady in the Water
 The Lake House
 The Light Between Oceans
 The Last Kiss
 Le Divorce
 Legally Blonde
 Legally Blonde 2: Red, White & Blonde
 Little Black Book
 Little Fockers
 Mamma Mia
 Margot at the Wedding
 Meet the Fockers
 Meet the Parents
 The Mistress of Spices
 Mona Lisa Smile
 Monster-in-Law
 Mozart and the Whale
 New in Town
 New York Minute
 New Year's Eve
 Nick & Norah's Infinite Playlist
 Norbit
 No Strings Attached
 One for the Money
 One Last Dance
 Office Christmas Party
 The Phantom of the Opera
 Picture Perfect
 Prime
 The Prince & Me
 The Prince & Me 2: The Royal Wedding
 The Prince & Me 3: A Royal Honeymoon
 The Prince & Me 4: The Elephant Adventure
 The Princess Diaries
 The Princess Diaries 2: Royal Engagement
 Proof
 P.S.
 Remember Me
 Revolutionary Road
 Salt
 Sydney White
 Save the Last Dance
 Serendipity
 Stuck in Love
 Shall We Dance?
 She's Out of My League
 She's the Man
 Shopgirl
 Simply Irresistible
 Something's Gotta Give
 Step Up
 Step Up 2: The Streets
 Step Up 3D
 The Stepford Wives
 Sweet Home Alabama
 Sweet November
 Sabrina
 There's Something About Mary
 Titanic
 Totally Spies! The Movie
 The Tourist
 Tully
 Twilight
 The Twilight Saga: Breaking Dawn – Part 1
 The Twilight Saga: Breaking Dawn – Part 2
 The Twilight Saga: Eclipse
 The Twilight Saga: New Moon
 Two Weeks Notice
  Up in the Air
 The Ugly Truth
 Valentine's Day
 Vanity Fair
 View from the Top
 Waitress
 We Don't Live Here Anymore
 Wedding Crashers
 The Wedding Date
 Wedding Daze
 The Wedding Singer
 Win a Date with Tad Hamilton!
 What Men Want
 Weather Girl
 We're the Millers

Russian-language films 
 Battle for Sevastopol

British films 
 Bridget Jones's Baby
 Bridget Jones's Diary
 Bridget Jones: The Edge of Reason
 Bride & Prejudice
 Definitely, Maybe
 Love Actually
 Pride & Prejudice
 Provoked
 Sliding Doors
 Tamara Drewe

Spanish-language films 
 The Invisible Guest
 It's Now Or Never
 Three Steps Above Heaven
 El que busca encuentra
 American Curious

Direct-to-video and television films 
 12 Men of Christmas
 Britney: For the Record
 I Me Wed
 Legacy
 Life-Size
 The Lion in Winter

Hindi-language films 
 Monsoon Wedding

Turkish-language films 
 4N1K
 8 Seconds
 A Small September Affair
 Acı Tatlı Ekşi
 Aşk Geliyorum Demez 
 Aşk Bu Mu?
 Aşk Tutulması
 Aşk Yolu
 Asmalı Konak: Hayat
 Âdem'in Trenleri
 Babam
 Bir Aşk Hikayesi
 Cute & Dangerous
 Çocuklar Sana Emanet
 Delibal
 The Crimean
 Everything About Mustafa
 Gülizar
 Gallipoli: End of the Road
 İlk Aşk
 Janjan
 Kötü Çocuk
 Kardeşim Benim
 Kardeşim Benim 2
 Love, Bitter
 Mustang
 Mutluluk Zamanı
 Magic Carpet Ride
 Mahpeyker: Kösem Sultan
 My Father and My Son
 My Grandfather's People
 Öteki Taraf
 Okul
 Rüzgar
 Red Istanbul
 Türkan
 Son Ders
 Seni Seviyorum Adamım
 Sonsuz Aşk
 The Sultan's Women
 Yüreğine Sor
 Veda

Chinese-language films 
 Step Up: Year of the Dance

Film blocks 
 Brought to you by Zain Movies 10 p.m. KSA / 9 p.m. CLT
 Clean & Clear Girls' Night In : Every Thursday 9 p.m. KSA / 8 p.m. CLT
 Clean & Clear Girls Only Movie Time : Every Thursdays and Fridays 10 p.m. KSA / 9 p.m. CLT
 Friday Movie Night : Fridays 8 p.m. KSA / 7 p.m. CLT
 Girls' Night In Movies : Every Friday 9 p.m. KSA / 8 p.m. CLT
 Movies : Every Night 11 p.m. KSA / 10 p.m. CLT
 Movies : Every Thursday and Friday 8 p.m. KSA / 7 p.m. CLT
 Movies : Every Thursdays and Fridays 9 p.m. KSA / 8 p.m. CLT
 Movies : Every Thursdays and Fridays 10 p.m. KSA / 9 p.m. CLT
 Turkish Movies : Every Thursdays and Fridays 10 p.m. KSA / 9 p.m. CLT
 Turkish Movies : Every Friday and Saturday 9 p.m. KSA / 8 p.m. CLT
 Turkish Movies : Every Friday 9:30 p.m. KSA / 8:30 p.m. CLT

Hosts 
 Raya Abirached (Correspondent at Hollywood) ;
 Ramzy Malouki (Correspondent at Hollywood) ;

Current Shows 

 Friends
 Scrubs
    Big Love
    Six-Degres 
    The Doctors
    That 70's Show
 Bad Teacher
 The Vacation Rental Show
 The Vacation Rental Show with Matt Landau
 Ghost Whisperer
 Grey's Anatomy
 Goldie's Oldies
 M.I. High
 Atlantis
 American Idol
 90210
 90210 (season 5)
 90210 (season 1)
 90210 (season 2)
 Medium
 Three Wishes
 House, M.D.
 Days of Our Lives
 The Early Show
 Six Degrees
 The Sarah Jane Adventures
 The Sparticle Mystery
 Two and a Half Men
 The Best Years
 The Good Wife
 Eastwick
 Alia
 Aliye
 Charmed
 Rachael Ray
 Dr. Phil
 The Doctors (2008 TV series)
 90210
 The Late Show with David Letterman
 The David Letterman Show
 The Oprah Winfrey Show
 The Insider
 Inside Edition
 Entertainment Tonight
 The Moment of Truth
 Citruss TV
 Friends
 Desperate Housewives
 So You Think You Can Dance (U.S. TV series)
 This Week
 Face the Nation
 Good Morning America
 Up to the Minute
 World News with Charles Gibson
 48 Hours
 CBS Evening News
 Primetime
 Nightline
 20/20
 When Saying Goodbye
 Army Wives
 Beauty and the Geek
 Big Love
 Scrubs
 That '70s Show
 Don't Say Goodbye (Turkish Series)
 The Lost Dream (Turkish Series)
 Life Goes On (Turkish Series)
 October Road
 Tricky TV
 The Most Dangerous Ways to School

Former/Recurrent Shows

 Buffy the Vampire Slayer
 So You Think You Can Dance
 So You Think You Can Dance
 The Biggest Loser
 The Biggest Loser
 North Shore (TV Series)
 North Shore
 Grey's Anatomy
 Desperate Housewives
 Jake In Progress
 Bones (TV Series)
 Bones
 According To Jim
 Hope & Faith
 Mad About You
 Jeopardy! 
 Race To The Altar 
 Wheel Of Fortune
 Crossing Jordan
 Numb3rs
 That Seventies Show
 Haunted Hotels

 What Not to Wear
 Monk
 3rd Rock From the Sun
 Medical Investigation
 ER
 Two and a Half Men 
 Supernanny
 Popular
 Brat Camp
 Seinfeld
 How to Live Longer
 The Bernie Mac Show
 Malcolm in the Middle
 One on One

 8 Simple Rules For Dating My Teenage Daughter
 America's Got Talent
 Ghost Whisperer
 House Swap
 House
 Moonlighting
 Summerland
 The OC
 That's So Raven
 Hannah Montana
 The Suite Life of Zack & Cody
 Falcon Beach
 Frasier
 Quintuplets
 The Biggest Loser
 America's Got Talent
 Clueless
 Sabrina the Teenage Witch
  "The Biggest Loser"
   "America's Got Talent"
   "So You Think You Can Dance"
   "Hunted Hotels"
   "Desperate Housewives"
   "Buffy The Vampire Slayer"

List of TV Shows and News 

 North Shore
 Jake In Progress
 Hope & Faith
SEX SHOW
Grey's Anatomy
Charmed
 Bones
Alias
Super Nanny
Living With Fran
According To Jim
Scrubs
Rachel Ray
Dr. Phil
The Oprah Winfrey Show
 The Bold And The Beautiful
Desire
Life With Bonnie
Friends
Mad About You
The Biggest Loser
How I Met Your Mother
Pepper Dennis
Jeopardy!
 Quintuplets
 Wheel Of Fortune
 Days of Our Lives
Once and Again
The Insider
Inside Edition
3rd Rock From The Sun
Medium
Bridezillas
Designers Fashions and Runways
Strong Medicine
Wife Swap (as House Swap)
So You Think You Can Dance
Miss Seventeen
Making The Band
That Seventies Show
Las Vegas
The Early Show
 This Week
 Face the Nation
Good Morning America
Up To The Minute
World News with Charles Gibson
48 Hours
CBS Evening News
 Primetime
 20/20
 Nightline
 Sue Thomas F.B.Eye
 Monk
 Everybody Hates Chris
 Summerland
 Hell's Kitchen
 3rd Rock From the Sun
 Medical Investigation
 ER
 International Fight League
 Australian Princess
 Mad About You
 Race To The Altar 
 Crossing Jordan
 Numb3rs
 What Not to Wear
 ER
 Two and a Half Men 
 Supernanny
 Popular
 Brat Camp
 Bones
 How To Live Longer
 The Bernie Mac Show
 Malcolm in the Middle
 One on One
 8 Simple Rules For Dating My Teenage Daughter
 America's Got Talent
 Desperate Housewives
 So You Think You Can Dance
 Ghost Whisperer
 House Swap
 House
 Moonlighting
 Citruss Tv
 The OC
 Jimmy Kimmel Live
 My Name Is Earl
 Ghost Whisperers
 The Moment of The Truth
 The Moment of Truth
 Noor
 That's So Raven
 Hannah Montana
 The Suite Life of Zack & Cody

References 

Lists of television series by network
Middle East Broadcasting Center
MBC 4 series